Orenthial James Brigance (born September 29, 1969) is a former football linebacker who played in the Canadian Football League (CFL) and the National Football League (NFL). He is the senior advisor to player development for the Baltimore Ravens.

Football career
Brigance was born in Houston and played college football at Rice University, where he was a three-year starter. He graduated from Rice with a degree in managerial studies in 1992.

Beginning his pro career as a linebacker in the CFL with the BC Lions in 1991, Brigance played three seasons and 54 games. His best season came in 1993, when he recorded 20 sacks and was a CFL West All-Star. Brigance then played for the Baltimore Stallions for two seasons, becoming a CFL All-Star in 1995, recording seven sacks and helping his team win the Grey Cup.

In 1996, Brigance was signed by the Miami Dolphins as a free agent. He was twice voted a team captain during his four seasons there and his teammates named him Ed Block Courage Award recipient in 1999. In addition, he was honored with the NFL Player Association's "Unsung Hero Award" that same season.

The next year, he was signed by the Baltimore Ravens. Brigance was a key contributor to the Ravens' championship-winning team as he finished second on the team with 25 special teams tackles and led the team with 10 special teams tackles in the post-season (including the first tackle of Super Bowl XXXV). He played for St. Louis Rams in 2001 and 2002, and a final game with the New England Patriots before retiring.

He is one of several players to have won both a CFL and NFL championship, and the only player in the history of both leagues to win those championships for the same city.

During his time as a Dolphin, Brigance was involved in a number of different community organizations, including Habitat for Humanity, Cystic Fibrosis Foundation and the Daily Food Bank.

He is currently the director of player development for the Ravens and was a member of the 2013 team that won Super Bowl XLVII.

Personal life
In May 2007, Brigance was diagnosed with amyotrophic lateral sclerosis (Lou Gehrig's disease), a motor neuron disease that is eventually fatal. He has created a foundation to assist ALS research called the Brigance Brigade Foundation. For his ALS activism, Brigance was one of two recipients of the 2016 NCAA Inspiration Award, sharing honors with late Mount St. Joseph University basketball player and pediatric cancer victim Lauren Hill.

Brigance is a Christian.

References

External links
 Brigance Brigade official website

1969 births
Living people
African-American players of American football
African-American players of Canadian football
American football linebackers
Baltimore Ravens players
Baltimore Stallions players
BC Lions players
Canadian football linebackers
Miami Dolphins players
New England Patriots players
People with motor neuron disease
Players of American football from Houston
Players of Canadian football from Houston
Rice Owls football players
St. Louis Rams players
21st-century African-American people
20th-century African-American sportspeople
Ed Block Courage Award recipients